Atlantidosteus is an extinct genus of homostiid arthrodire from the Early to Middle Devonian of Morocco and Queensland. It contains two known species, A. hollardi and A. pacifica.

Description 
Atlantidosteus pacifica is known from a right suborbital plate, found in the Broken River Group of Queensland, Australia.

Phylogeny 
Atlantidosteus is part of the clade Migmatocephala, closer related to Homostius, than Antineosteus.

The cladogram shown here is based on Young, 2003

References 

Fossil taxa described in 1984
Homostiidae
Arthrodire genera
Placoderms of Australia
Placoderms of Africa